Gofu is a South African comic book, written, drawn and self published in 2013 by Deon de Lange. It is Deon de Lange's first comic book and was launched at the Open Book Comics Fest 2013 in Cape Town. Gofu was also launched at Four Shots, a Durban comic launch, where the author announced that the title would become a limited mini-series publication. It is a short black and white fantasy comic book, rendered in fine detail and beautifully printed in a large, European comics format.

Gofu Part two was launched on Free Comic Book Day 2014.

Velocity Graphic Anthology #4, which will launch at San Diego Comic-Con International 2014, features Gofu Part 1 in full color. Additionally, Gofu is also one of the South African indy books that will be handed out for free at the Velocity panel, "The Pursuit of the Southern Hemisphere comic industry".

Story
A fantasy story about a gentle behemoth who must flee extinction with his only friend Tatsu, and seek a new home in an unknown world...

See also

South African comics
List of comic books

External links
Official website
Open Book Comics Fest
Interview: Deon de Lange - A comic book story

References

South African comics